The 1920–21 Rugby Union County Championship was the 28th edition of England's premier rugby union club competition at the time. 

Gloucestershire won the competition for the fourth time defeating Leicestershire in the final.

Semifinals

Final

See also
 English rugby union system
 Rugby union in England

References

Rugby Union County Championship
County Championship (rugby union) seasons